Andreína Tarazón Bolívar (born 8 February 1988) is a Venezuelan politician that has served as deputy of the National Assembly and minister for Women and Gender Equality.

Career 
She graduated as a lawyer from the Central University of Venezuela, and started her political career taking part in the support team of Misión Robinson in Aragua in 2003 and in the colectivo Pueblo Soberano de la Placera between 2002 and 2003. While being a law student she was a member of the University Transformation Movement and took part in the student committee that supported the government in the National Assembly in 2007, as well as a juvenile delegate in the foundational congress of the United Socialist Party of Venezuela (PSUV) Youth. She was elected as the candidate of the PSUV in the 2010 parliamentary elections, was named the vice minister of Youth and on 21 April 2013 was named as Minister for Women and Gender Equality for the government of Nicolás Maduro. Since 27 January 2014, she has served as National Superintendent for the Defense of the Socioeconomic Rights.

References 

1988 births
People from Maracay
21st-century Venezuelan women politicians
21st-century Venezuelan politicians
Venezuelan women lawyers
United Socialist Party of Venezuela politicians
Women government ministers of Venezuela
Members of the National Assembly (Venezuela)
Central University of Venezuela alumni
Living people